Phosphatidylinositol transfer protein alpha isoform is a protein that in humans is encoded by the PITPNA gene.

Phosphatidylinositol transfer proteins are a diverse set of cytosolic phospholipid transfer proteins that are distinguished by their ability to transfer phospholipids between membranes in vitro (Wirtz, 1991).

References

Further reading

Water-soluble transporters
Peripheral membrane proteins